Boboy Salonga: Batang Tondo is a 1992 Filipino action film directed by Junn P. Cabreira. The film stars Jeric Raval in the title role, alongside Monica Herrera, Vic Vargas, Mark Gil, Rina Reyes, Francis Magalona, Jennifer Mendoza, Ronel Victor, Ali Sotto and Dick Israel. Produced by OctoArts Films, the film was released in May 1992.

Critic Justino Dormiendo of the Manila Standard gave the film a negative review, criticizing its lack of believability and being another example of Philippine cinema's "gross commercialization" through its tendency for violence.

Cast
Jeric Raval as Boboy Salonga
Monica Herrera as Rhea
Vic Vargas as Victor Salonga
Mark Gil as Lt. Ventura
Rina Reyes as Marina
Francis Magalona as Obet
Jennifer Mendoza as Elsa
Ronel Victor as Bakal
Ali Sotto as Dolor Salonga
Dick Israel as Cpl. Tumang
Kevin Delgado as Bogart
Mike Castillo as Bakal's Gang
Gerald Ejercito as Bakal's Gang
Jason Roman as Bakal's Gang
Jet Gavino as Bakal's Gang
Mikko Manson as Bakal's Gang
Ernie Ortega as Chief of Police
Ernie Forte as Kadyo
Vic Belaro as Terio
Jimmy Reyes as Bodyguard
Jerry Acosta as Bodyguard
Eric De Vera as Sward
Che-Che Veneracion as Che-Che
Ronnie Francisco as Mr. Ching

Production
After the success of actor Jeric Raval's debut film Kalabang Mortal ni Baby Ama (also known as Primitivo 'Ebok' Ala) at the box office, he was next given the lead role by OctoArts Films in Boboy Salonga: Batang Tondo. The film is also rapper Francis Magalona's first film since taking a hiatus from films after starring in Iputok Mo... Dadapa Ako! (Hard to Die) in 1990.

Release
Boboy Salonga was released in theaters in May 1992.

Critical response
Justino Dormiendo, writing for the Manila Standard, gave Boboy Salonga a negative review, considering it as "another proof of the unrelieved proclivity to sex and violence by our filmmakers." He criticized the film's story as lacking believability, while the filmmaking, "from Jojo Lapus's script and Junn Cabreira's direction down to the cast — with the possible exception of [Vic] Vargas and Ali Sotto — smack of the gross commercialization of local cinema, mainly through the violence..."

References

External links

1992 films
1992 action films
Action films based on actual events
Filipino-language films
Films set in Manila
OctoArts Films films
Philippine action films